Mochrum Loch is a large, irregular shaped, shallow, freshwater loch in Dumfries and Galloway, in the Southern Uplands of south-west Scotland. The loch has several rocky islets.

Survey
The loch was surveyed in 1903 by James Murray and later charted  as part of Sir John Murray's Bathymetrical Survey of Fresh-Water Lochs of Scotland 1897-1909.

References

Lochs of Dumfries and Galloway
Freshwater lochs of Scotland